James Bowman Simpson (born 24 April 1959) was a Scottish footballer who played for Kilmarnock, Dumbarton and Morton.

References

1959 births
Scottish footballers
Dumbarton F.C. players
Kilmarnock F.C. players
Greenock Morton F.C. players
Scottish Football League players
Living people
Association football midfielders